Neosolieria  is a genus of tachinid flies in the family Tachinidae.

Species
Neosolieria nasuta Townsend, 1927
Neosolieria silus (Reinhard, 1958)

Distribution
Peru.

References

Diptera of North America
Diptera of South America
Dexiinae
Tachinidae genera
Taxa named by Charles Henry Tyler Townsend